Galewela  is a town in Sri Lanka. It is located Ambepussa- Trincomalee A6 Road within Matale District, Central Province.

Population In Galewela.

Total Population :     69715

 Muslims      :   9427
 Buddhist     :   56201
 Roman Catholic:   3215
 Hindus        :    872

Local Government Council
Galewela is the administrative centre of Galewela Pradeshiya Sabha.

See also
List of towns in Central Province, Sri Lanka

External links

Populated places in Matale District